The Camará Dam was a dam located on the Mamanguape River in Paraiba, northeastern Brazil. It burst on June 17, 2004, flooding towns of Alagoa Grande and Mulungu. At least three people died by drowning.

References 

Dams in Paraíba
Dam failures in Brazil
Dams completed in 2002
2002 establishments in Brazil
Man-made disasters in Brazil